Cotula moseleyi, also known as Nightingale brassbuttons, is a species of flowering plant in the sunflower family.  It has been found only in the Tristan da Cunha chain of islands in the South Atlantic Ocean.  Its natural habitats are subantarctic forests, subantarctic grassland, rocky shores, and hillsides. It is threatened by habitat loss.

References

moseleyi
Flora of Tristan da Cunha
Vulnerable plants
Plants described in 1884
Taxonomy articles created by Polbot